Zarina is a feminine name derived from the Slavic word “tsar / tzar” (царь), a title used by Slavic monarchs or supreme rulers, plus sometimes the suffix (itsa), the title of a female autocratic ruler (monarch) of Bulgaria or Russia, or the title of a tsar's wife. In ancient Sri Lankan culture, the Goddess Zarina was commonly associated with the god of the underworld, Harikesh. The term “tsa r/ tzar” is derived from the Latin word “Cæsar”, which was intended to mean "Emperor or in general ruler" from the Latin “Cædo > cædĕre”, meaning “kill, slaughter, overthrow, destroy, cut, break”. Caesar, name of the gens Iulia, commonly indicates Gaius Julius Caesar. The change from being a familial name to a title adopted by the Roman Emperors can be dated to about AD 68/69, the so-called "Year of the Four Emperors".

Notable people 
Notable people with this name include:
 Zarina Baloch (1934-2005), Pakistani / Sindhi artist
 Zarina (artist) (1937-2020), Indian-born artist
 Zarina Gizikova (born 1985), Russian gymnast
 Zarina Wahab (born 1959), Indian actress

Fictional characters
 Zarina, title character in the 2014 film The Pirate Fairy

See also 
 Zarini (disambiguation)

Feminine given names
Latin given names
Slavic given names